In religion, heterodoxy (from Ancient Greek: , "other, another, different" + , "popular belief") means "any opinions or doctrines at variance with an official or orthodox position". Under this definition, heterodoxy is similar to unorthodoxy, while the adjective 'heterodox' could be applied to a dissident.

Heterodoxy is also an ecclesiastical term of art, defined in various ways by different religions and churches. For example, in the apostolic churches (the Eastern Orthodox Church, the Roman Catholic Church, the Church of the East, the Anglican Communion, and the Oriental Orthodox Churches), heterodoxy may describe beliefs that differ from strictly orthodox views, but that fall short either of formal or of material heresy.

Christianity

Eastern Orthodoxy
In the Eastern Orthodox Church, the term is used primarily in reference to Christian churches and denominations not belonging to the communion of Eastern Orthodox churches and espousing doctrines contrary to the received Holy Tradition. It also describes any theological position, moral principle, spiritual practice, or lifestyle thought to be inconsistent with the Catholic Rule of Faith. In general, this term is used in two distinct senses:

To label a theological system or viewpoint which, although erroneous and unacceptable to hold or promote within Orthodoxy, has not been formally defined as heresy.
To label a theological system or viewpoint which is both contrary to Orthodoxy and whose adherents have not been baptized into the Church, so that the attribution of heresy would be improper.

Roman Catholicism
Heterodoxy in the Roman Catholic Church refers to views that differ from strictly orthodox views, but retain sufficient faithfulness to the original doctrine to avoid heresy. Many Roman Catholics profess some heterodox views, either on doctrinal or social issues.

Protestantism
Many Protestants, such as Lutherans, consider Christian teachings which are not in agreement with their understanding of scripture to be heterodoxical.  As Charles Spurgeon says:

[Y]ou shall find spiritual life in every church. I know it is the notion of the bigot, that all the truly godly people belong to the denomination which he adorns. Orthodoxy is my doxy; heterodoxy is anybody else's doxy who does not agree with me.

Islam
The Arabic word  is used by Shia Muslims for beliefs perceived as being extremely heterodox (more in line with the Christian use of the word "heresy"). In particular, the term is used to describe the beliefs of minority Muslim groups who ascribe divine characteristics to a member of Muhammad's family (especially Ali) or the early companions of the Prophet such as Salman the Persian. The assumption is that the groups thus described have gone too far and have come to associate them with God.

A third and much smaller movement is Ibadi, which differ from both of these groups on a few key points. Several ultra-orthodox groups such as the Wahhabis, in turn, see themselves as the only truly orthodox groups within Islam.

The Shia Ismailis, who in turn split from the Shia mainstream of Twelvers over another succession dispute, have subsumed several groups which the majority of Muslims view as heterodox, such as the Seveners, and gnostic-influenced Alawites, and many other sects and subsects. The gnostic-influenced Druze sect has also been affiliated with the Ismailis, but some of its followers go so far as to see it as a distinct religion altogether. The Sufis, divided into many sects and orders, incorporate many mystical doctrines and rituals into Islam, but many also consider themselves Shi'i or Sunnis. Another Shia group, influenced heavily by the Sufis, Turkic religion and other mystical movements, is that of the Alevi. Historical groups viewed as highly heterodox by most Muslims include the Kharijites, who took a third view on Ali's succession (and are today succeeded by the Ibadi), the Mu'tazilites, who most famously asserted that the Qur'an was created, a view which enjoyed Caliphal approval before the time of Mutawakkil, the Qarmatians, a branch of the Seveners within Ismaili Islam who took control of much of the Arabian peninsula in the 9th and 10th century, practiced vegetarianism, attacked Hajj pilgrims and took control of the Well of Zamzam and the Black Stone before their decline, and the Hashashin or Assassins, another Ismaili group, famous for their reclusive lifestyle, manners of indoctrination and assassinations in the years after the First Crusade.

According to Philip Hitti, during the Umayyad and Abbasid caliphates there was a marked tendency among several quite unrelated heterodox groups to affiliate themselves with the Shiites, particularly the Ismailis, in a general feeling of heterodox solidarity in a Sunni-controlled empire. The cause of the Alids thus became a rallying point for a diverse range of heterodox Islamic movements. The view that Ali was divine, though never mainstream within Shiism, is attested in the early centuries of Islam.

Two more recent movements seen as particularly at odds with the majority Muslim view are the Ahmadiyya and Nation of Islam movements. Many followers of the former consider its 19th century founder, Mirza Ghulam Ahmad, to have been a prophet, as well as such other religious figures as Krishna and Buddha, despite the mainstream Muslim view that Muhammad was the last. Both Ahmadi denominations consider Ahmad to have been the Mahdi and second coming of Jesus. The Nation of Islam is a movement which acknowledges its 20th century founder, Wallace Fard Muhammad, as an incarnation of Allah, a view most Muslims consider  (polytheism). Bábism (most followers of which came to follow Baha'u'llah and became the Baháʼí Faith and were further divided into many sects) is viewed by many non-followers as originally having been a highly divergent movement within the Twelver Ismailism practiced in 19th century Persia. Beyond heterodoxy, many elements of Islam have been incorporated into distinct belief systems several times, most specifically into Sikhism and the Baháʼí Faith, whose predecessor movement was Bábism.

Hinduism

The main schools of Indian philosophy that reject the absoluteness of the Vedas, including Buddhism and Jainism, were regarded as heterodox by Hinduism. In 2015, the Supreme Court of India ruled that Hinduism cannot be narrowed down to particular beliefs or doctrine, saying that it "incorporates all forms of belief without mandating the selection or elimination of any one single belief".

In China
In late 1999, legislation was created in China to outlaw "heterodox religions". This was applied retroactively to Falun Gong, a spiritual practice introduced to the public in China by Li Hongzhi in 1992.

Economics
Heterodox economics refers to schools of economic thought considered outside of mainstream economics, referred to as orthodox economics, often represented by expositors as contrasting with or going beyond neoclassical economics.

Heterodox economics refers to the consideration of a variety of economic schools and methodologies, which can include neoclassical or other orthodox economics in part. Heterodox economics refers to a variety of separate unorthodox approaches or schools such as institutional, post-Keynesian, socialist, Marxian, feminist, Georgist, Austrian, ecological, and social economics, among others.

See also
 Adiaphora
 Āstika and nāstika
 Catholicity
 Christian apologetics
 Christian countercult movement
 Christian heresy
 Orthodoxy
 Schism
 Sikh sects

References

Further reading

External links

 Heterodox - the word of the day
 Heterodox Economics
 Orthodox vs Heterodox Churches (Lutheran confessionalism)

Christian terminology
Religious belief and doctrine